Nemacerota sejilaa is a moth in the family Drepanidae. It was described by Zhao-Hui Pan, Gábor Ronkay, László Ronkay and Hui-Lin Han in 2014. It is found in Tibet, China.

The wingspan is 42–46 mm. The ground colour of the forewings is silvery ash grey with a thin black basal band. The subbasal line is double, waved and dark grey filled with ground colour. The antemedial line is black, defined by red scales and double and the median line is rather indistinct, shadow-like and grey. The hindwings are lighter pale whitish grey with a fine ochreous-pinkish hue. Adults are on wing from late July to late August.

Etymology
The species name refers to Mt. Sejila, the type locality.

References

Moths described in 2014
Thyatirinae